Eugenia mexicana is a species of plant in the family Myrtaceae. It is endemic to Mexico.

References

mexicana
Endemic flora of Mexico
Trees of Chiapas
Trees of Oaxaca
Trees of Veracruz
Vulnerable plants
Taxonomy articles created by Polbot